Openbank is an online bank, headquartered in Madrid, Spain. Since its foundation in 1995, it has been a subsidiary of Grupo Santander. According to the Spanish Banking Association, by the end of 2016 nearly 1,350,000 accounts had been registered with the bank.

History
Banco Santander created Openbank in 1995, and launched a website for it in 1996. In 2000, after buying the Argentine portal Patagon.com for $540 million, Openbank changed its name to Patagon Internet Bank S.A., a financial portal that combined traditional banking with digital features such as chatrooms and internet forums. In 2001, Patagon Internet Bank S.A. opened commercial offices in Zaragoza, Madrid, Pamplona, Valencia, and Barcelona. In 2005 it was renamed to Openbank.

In 2011 it released a banking app for iOS and Android. In March 2011, the entity, after its integration in the Commercial Banking Spain division, chose to close 20 of the 21 branches it still had open. The only one that remained open was the Azca branch, in Madrid.

In February 2013, it launched mobile applications for Android and Windows 8. 

In May 2017, it modified its corporate image and renamed some of its products. In addition, it opened its new branch at number 134 Paseo de la Castellana in Madrid, with the aim of creating an exclusive space for its clients.

In June 2017, it launched its new digital web platform and app, improving its usability and ease of use. 

In 2019, it began its international expansion in Germany, the Netherlands and Portugal.

Features
Openbank offers a 24x7 service to all its customers. This allows them to be in permanent contact with the branch, by telephone, email or chat.

In addition, it allows them to deposit or withdraw cash, commission-free, at the more than 4,500 ATMs in the Santander network in Spain.

Open Wealth has been created as its new investment platform. With this platform customers can invest, in real time from a computer or mobile phone, in the more than twenty-five markets available to them through the professional trading tool.

The bank also offers a family plan, Open Young, which has a prepaid card for use by children who can even request payment from their own app.

It also has a function that allows customers to activate or deactivate their cards whenever they want, from anywhere, or to defer payments from their mobile.

In addition, Open Mortgage customers can obtain a mortgage with a nominal interest rate of Euribor + 0.99%.

Management
CEO: Ezequiel Szafir Holcman

Sources

Online banks
Banks based in Madrid
Banco Santander